The northern red-bellied turtle (Pseudemys rubriventris) or American red-bellied turtle is a species of turtle in the Pseudemys (cooter) genus of the family Emydidae.

Description

Distribution and habitat
It is endemic to the United States. The current range of the red-bellied turtle includes a population in Massachusetts, the Plymouth red-bellied turtle, which was previously considered a distinct subspecies (Pseudemys rubriventris bangsi) as well as the coastal areas of New Jersey, Pennsylvania, Delaware, Maryland, Virginia and North Carolina.

The red-bellied turtle has appeared on Pennsylvania Fish Commission lists of endangered amphibians and reptiles since 1978 (McCoy 1985). By 1985 the red-bellied turtle was known to exist in Pennsylvania only in isolated colonies in a few counties (McCoy 1985). Small (less than thirty individuals) colonies were known in Manor and Silver lakes in Bucks county, the Tinicum wetlands in Philadelphia and Delaware counties, the West Branch of Conococheague Creek in Franklin County and possibly Springton Reservoir in Delaware county (McCoy 1985).

Conservation
The red-bellied turtle is a threatened species within Pennsylvania. However, it is listed as endangered by the US Fish and Wildlife Service as well as the Division of Fisheries and Wildlife (Massachusetts).

The potential threats to red-bellied turtle populations are numerous. For example: wetland loss, habitat fragmentation, pollution, collecting of turtles for pets, food or other trophies, competition with the invasive red-eared slider turtle for food, habitat, basking sites or nesting sites, and the potential for hybridization with red-eared slider turtles.

The Massachusetts wildlife preserve foundation has started to repopulate the turtles by placing them in many south-eastern Massachusetts ponds. One example is at Long and Little Long Pond in Plymouth, Massachusetts, where the population is starting to regrow.

References

 Tortoise & Freshwater Turtle Specialist Group 1996.  Pseudemys rubriventris.   2006 IUCN Red List of Threatened Species.   Downloaded on 29 July 2007.
Article title
https://web.archive.org/web/20070824020806/http://www.dgif.state.va.us/wildlife/species/display.asp?id=030057
 McCoy, C. J. 1985. Species of Special Concern in Pennsylvania, in H. H. Genoways and F. J. Brenner, editors. Special Publication of Carnegie Museum of Natural Pennsylvania. Carnegie Museum of Natural History, Pittsburgh, PA.
 http://www.mass.gov/eea/docs/dfg/nhesp/species-and-conservation/nhfacts/pseudemys-rubriventris.pdf

Bibliography

Pseudemys
Reptiles of North America
Fauna of the Eastern United States
Reptiles described in 1830
Taxonomy articles created by Polbot